Philip Douglas Barlow (19 December 1946 – December 2019) was an English professional footballer who played as a half back.

Career
Born in Shipley, Barlow played for Guiseley, Bradford City and Lincoln City. For Bradford City, he made 16 appearances in the Football League. For Lincoln City, he made 5 appearances in the Football League; he also made 1 Cup appearance. At Guiseley he played between 1968 and 1982. He also played for Salts and Bradford (Park Avenue).

His death was announced in December 2019.

Sources

References

1946 births
2019 deaths
English footballers
Guiseley A.F.C. players
Bradford City A.F.C. players
Lincoln City F.C. players
English Football League players
Association football defenders
Sportspeople from Shipley, West Yorkshire
Salts F.C. players
Bradford (Park Avenue) A.F.C. players